Álvaro Daniel Seijas (born October 10, 1998) is a Venezuelan professional baseball pitcher who is currently a free agent. He signed with the St. Louis Cardinals as an international free agent in 2015.

Career
Seijas signed with the St. Louis Cardinals as an international free agent on July 2, 2015. He made his professional debut in 2016 with the Dominican Summer League Cardinals before being promoted to the Gulf Coast League Cardinals. Over 14 games (13 starts), he went 5–2 with a 3.38 ERA, striking out 55 over  innings. In 2017, he played with the rookie-level Johnson City Cardinals, going 4–3 with a 4.97 ERA over 12 starts, and in 2018, he pitched for the Single-A Peoria Chiefs, compiling a 5–8 record with a 4.52 ERA over 25 games (22 starts). Seijas began the 2019 season back with Peoria, with whom he was named a Midwest League All-Star, before being promoted to the High-A Palm Beach Cardinals in July. Over 24 starts with both clubs, he went 8–6 with a 2.81 ERA, compiling 114 strikeouts over  innings.

The Cardinals added Seijas to their 40-man roster after the 2019 season. He did not play a minor league game in 2020 due to the cancellation of the minor league season caused by the COVID-19 pandemic. On August 21, 2020, Seijas was outrighted off of the 40-man roster. To begin the 2021 season, he was assigned to the Double-A Springfield Cardinals. After posting an 8.78 ERA in six games for Springfield, Seijas was released by the Cardinals on July 27, 2021.

References

External links

Living people
1998 births
Tigres de Aragua players
Dominican Summer League Cardinals players
Venezuelan expatriate baseball players in the Dominican Republic
Gulf Coast Cardinals players
Johnson City Cardinals players
Peoria Chiefs players
Palm Beach Cardinals players
Springfield Cardinals players